Eitkūnai (transliterated Chernyshevskoye; , from 1938: Eydtkau; }}) is a settlement in is a city in Vilkaviškis District Municipality, in Marijampolė County, Lithuania, close to the border with Lithuania. Between Chernyshevskoye and Lithuanian Kybartai is an important 24-hour border crossing point on the A229 principal road (part of the European route E28) and the railway route connecting Kaliningrad with Moscow through Lithuania and Belarus.

History
The settlement was first mentioned in the 16th century, when the area was part of the Polish Duchy of Prussia, near where its eastern border ran as stipulated by the 1422 Treaty of Melno. 

Incorporated into the Prussian province of East Prussia, Eydtkuhnen became the eastern terminus and border station of the Prussian Eastern Railway in 1860, connecting Berlin with the Saint Petersburg–Warsaw Railway in the Russian Empire. To continue their voyage, passengers—e.g., of the Nord Express luxury train coming from Saint Petersburg—had to change over from Russian broad gauge to standard gauge railcars to Berlin and Paris, leaving on the other side of the platform. The same interchange in the opposite direction was provided at the Russian train station in neighboring Virbalis (Wirballen). The Eydtkuhnen station building, erected according to plans by Friedrich August Stüler, offered luxuriously furnished waiting rooms and restaurants. 

The railway connection decisively promoted Eydtkuhnen's development: the Neo-Romanesque Lutheran parish church was built according to plans by Friedrich Adler and consecrated in 1889; the settlement received town privileges in 1922, when the population reached 10,000. Nevertheless, Eydtkuhnen was devastated during the Russian invasion of East Prussia in 1914 and again in 1945 during the East Prussian Offensive of the Red Army. After World War I and the Act of Independence, the border crossing led to Lithuania, while corridor trains provided the railway connection to Berlin.

With the implementation of the Oder-Neisse line after World War II, the area became part of the Soviet Union, while the remaining German population was expelled. Up to today, large parts of Chernyshevskoye are a military restricted area.

Notable people
 Gertrud von Puttkamer (1881–1944), writer
 Wilhelm Gaerte (1890 Eydtkuhnen- 1958 Hannover), archaeologist, museum director 
 Felix Bressart (1892–1949), actor
 Barnett A. Elzas (1867-1936), rabbi and historian
 Herbert Kirrinnis (1907–1977), Gymnasium teacher and Historian
 Dieter Biallas (1936–2016), politician (FDP), mayor and senator in Hamburg
 Ernst Helmut Segschneider (* 1938), scientist

External links

Rural localities in Kaliningrad Oblast